Barbara Hannigan  (born 8 May 1971) is a Canadian soprano and conductor, known for her performances of contemporary opera.

Education
Hannigan's initial musical education came from music teachers in her hometown of Waverley, Nova Scotia, in Halifax.

After growing up in Waverley, Hannigan moved to Toronto at the age of 17. She studied music at the University of Toronto, where her teachers included Mary Morrison. She graduated from the University of Toronto with a Bachelor of Music degree in 1993 and a Master of Music degree in 1998. She continued her studies at the Banff Centre for the Arts, the Steans Institute for Young Artists at the Ravinia Festival, and the Centre d'arts Orford. She also studied for one year at the Royal Conservatory of The Hague.

Career
Hannigan is known for her performances of contemporary music. Her advocacy of contemporary music began in her youth, and she sang her first world premiere at the age of 17. , she had premiered approximately 75 contemporary compositions. Hans Abrahamsen wrote the symphonic song cycle let me tell you for Hannigan.

Hannigan is particularly noted for her performances of György Ligeti's Mysteries of the Macabre (a concert version of a scene from his opera Le Grand Macabre); in 2011 she began to conduct the work in addition to singing the vocal part. Her work in contemporary opera has included singing in the premieres of Louis Andriessen's Writing to Vermeer, Gerald Barry's The Bitter Tears of Petra von Kant and The Importance of Being Earnest, Jan van de Putte's Wet Snow, Kris Defoort's House of the Sleeping Beauties, and George Benjamin's Written on Skin. She has worked with choreographer Sasha Waltz on productions of Toshio Hosokawa's Matsukaze and Pascal Dusapin's Passion. Hannigan received critical acclaim for her performance in Alban Berg's Lulu, which included dancing en pointe. In 2014, Hannigan sang the role of Marie in Bernd Alois Zimmermann's opera Die Soldaten at the Bavarian State Opera, a production that was streamed live on the internet. For her performance as Marie, she won the 2015 Der Faust (award) in Germany.

Hannigan regularly performs in concert as both soprano and conductor. She has worked with the Berlin Philharmonic, Münchner Philharmoniker, London Symphony Orchestra, Toronto Symphony, Orchestre philharmonique de Radio France, Göteborgs Symfoniker, Prague Philharmonic, Mahler Chamber Orchestra, Avanti! Chamber Orchestra, Accademia Nazionale di Santa Cecilia in Rome, Britten Sinfonia, Gulbenkian Orchestra, and The Cleveland Orchestra. She won the Ovatie 2014 award for her performance as soprano/conductor with her conducting debut at the Concertgebouw in Amsterdam with the Ludwig Orchestra.

In 2016, Hannigan was made a Member of the Order of Canada, one of Canada's highest civilian honours. She was a recipient of the Rolf Schock Prize 2018 in the Musical Arts. The jury commented: "Hannigan is an extraordinary and innovative performer with a dynamic and intensive approach to the music she performs, often pure virtuoso stage interpretations, in which she often simultaneously assumes both the role of soloist and conductor. Her repertoire covers an impressive field, with great interest in new music. For a number of years she has also run a unique mentoring project, Equilibrium Young Artists, which focuses on young and newly professional musicians around the world."

Other awards include Personalité Musicale de l'Année (Musical Personality of the Year) (Syndicat de la Presse Française, 2012), Singer of the Year (Opernwelt, 2013), Ehrenpreise, Preis der deutschen Schallplattenkritik 2018  and the Léonie Sonning Music Prize 2020.

Selected discography
Hannigan's commercial recordings in contemporary music include the premiere recording of Henri Dutilleux's Correspondances (Deutsche Grammophon) and Louis Andriessen's Writing to Vermeer (Nonesuch), music of Luca Francesconi (Kairos) and of Harry Freedman (Centrediscs). She is also featured on four Naxos recordings of vocal works of George Frideric Handel, L'Allegro, il Penseroso ed il Moderato, Gideon, Rinaldo, and Tobit.

Henri Dutilleux: Correspondances for soprano and orchestra, conducted Esa-Pekka Salonen, Deutsche Grammophon 2012 – world premiere recording with ending rewritten by the composer for Hannigan, Gramophone Award Contemporary, 2013
Hans Abrahamsen: let me tell you for soprano and orchestra, text by Paul Griffiths, Symphonieorchester des Bayerischen Rundfunks, Andris Nelsons conductor, Winter & Winter, 2016 – Awards: 2016 Grawemeyer Award (Music Composition); Gramophone Award Contemporary, 2016; Diapason d'Or 2016, Musique contemporaine; Edison Klassiek 2016, De ontdekking
 Eric Satie: Socrate with pianist Reinbert de Leeuw, Winter & Winter, 2016
Crazy Girl Crazy: debut album as soprano and conductor, Ludwig Orchestra, Alpha Classics 2017, repertoire: Luciano Berio Sequenza III, Alban Berg Lulu Suite, George Gershwin Girl Crazy Suite, arranged by Bill Elliott and Barbara Hannigan; album includes the documentary Music is Music directed by Mathieu Amalric – Awards: Grammy Award for Best Classical Solo Vocal Album; Juno Award for Classical Album of the Year: Vocal or Choral, 2018; Klara Award for Best International Classical CD; The New York Times: The Best Classical CDs of 2017.

In 2014 two DVDs were released: Alban Berg's Lulu (Bel Air Classiques) and George Benjamin's Written on Skin. Written on Skin received the Gramophone Award 2014 in the category "Contemporary".

Hannigan is featured on the London Symphony Orchestra DVD Stravinsky, released in 2017 on the LSO Live label, Simon Rattle conducting, performing Alban Berg's Three Fragments from Wozzeck and Gyorgy Ligeti's Mysteries of the Macabre.

Hannigan's artistic career has been the subject of two documentaries: Accentus Music's documentary I'm a creative animal, produced at Lucerne Festival 2014 where she was Artiste Etoile, Dutch television's Canadees Podiumdier (NTR 2014), as well as Mathieu Amalric's short film, C'est presque au bout du monde.

Personal life
Hannigan was previously married to Dutch theatre director . Since 2017, she has lived in Paris, France. Since 2015, she has been in a long-term relationship with French actor Mathieu Amalric.

References

External links
 
 Equilibrium Young Artists, mentor programme founded by Barbara Hannigan
 

1971 births
Living people
People from the Halifax Regional Municipality
Musicians from Nova Scotia
Canadian operatic sopranos
Canadian contemporary classical musicians
Edison Classical Music Awards winners
20th-century Canadian women opera singers
21st-century Canadian women opera singers
21st-century Canadian conductors (music)
Royal Conservatory of The Hague alumni
University of Toronto alumni
Women conductors (music)
20th-century Canadian conductors (music)
Members of the Order of Canada
Juno Award for Classical Album of the Year – Vocal or Choral Performance winners